Ab Korik (also Romanized as Āb Korīk and Ābkorīk) is a village in Javar Rural District, in the Central District of Kuhbanan County, Kerman Province, Iran. At the 2006 census, its population was 21, in 5 families.

References 

Populated places in Kuhbanan County